Disney's House of Mouse (or simply House of Mouse) is an American animated television series produced by Walt Disney Television Animation that originally aired for three seasons on ABC and Toon Disney from January 13, 2001, to its finale on October 24, 2003, with 52 episodes and 22 newly produced cartoon shorts made for the series. The show focuses on Mickey Mouse and his friends running a cartoon theater dinner club in the fictional ToonTown, catering to many characters from Disney cartoons and animated movies while showcasing a variety of their cartoon shorts. The series is named after a common nickname or epithet for the Walt Disney Company.

The animated series is a spin off of the popular short-lived Disney series Mickey Mouse Works, and featured many Mouse Works shorts as well as selection of brand new shorts; classic Mickey Mouse, Goofy and Donald Duck shorts from the 1930s–50s were also occasionally seen, particularly towards the end of the series' run when the finite backlog of Mouse Works shorts had almost been exhausted.

The show was generally well-received and became a big hit for Disney. During its time, the animated series held two nominations for awards, while select cast members won two awards for their performances as characters in House of Mouse. The series featured two direct-to-video films – Mickey's Magical Christmas: Snowed in at the House of Mouse and Mickey's House of Villains – along with an all-night marathon of the House of Mouse, aired on Toon Disney in September 2002 under the title "Night of 1,000 Toons".

Premise

The basic premise of the show focuses on Mickey Mouse and his friends operating a dinner theater club in downtown ToonTown. Considered a popular venue by the residents, the club is frequented by a host of characters from Disney animated properties; a notable feature of the series is that every film produced by Walt Disney Feature Animation prior to the start of the series (between and including Snow White and the Seven Dwarfs and Atlantis: The Lost Empire, with the exception of the CGI Dinosaur) are featured in the series, along with several Disney animated television shows. Such characters mostly appear as paying guests of the club, with a few voiced in episodes depending on the scripts provided to voice actors, although a number sometimes operate as performers for the club. The animated series is also notable for including many relatively obscure and otherwise rarely used Disney characters, often with speaking parts for the very first time – for example, Li'l Bad Wolf and April, May and June, who had appeared very often in Disney comic books but never before in an animated cartoon, finally made their animated debuts on House of Mouse. The show also featured some cameos by characters created for other television cartoons such as Pepper Ann and theme park attractions like The Haunted Mansion, but these appearances were few and far between.

Each episode focuses on a story involving Mickey and his associates facing an issue during an evening's operation of the club, and their efforts to overcome it – the most common plot for episodes involves the group dealing with a serious problem caused by Pete in his attempts to shut down the club and use it for his own gains. These stories, often involving farcical mishaps, tended to act as a wraparound for the cartoon shorts played in between scenes, the theme of the story contributing towards the story-lines of the cartoon shorts shown in the episode. Cartoon shorts played in episodes focused on elements from classic theatrical cartoons of the 1930s, 1940s and 1950s, though most were reruns from Mickey Mouse Works, and featured a simple story. Some stories were set to a specific theme for a specific character, but with differing scenarios – for example, one set focused on Mickey seeking to rescue Minnie from Pete, against a different obstacle in each short, while another set focused on Pluto's efforts to get Mickey his paper while facing a different problem.

Episodes

Characters
Mickey Mouse (voiced by Wayne Allwine): Mickey operates the club as general manager and co-owner, but leaves the club's management to his friends. His main role in the club is hosting the evening's entertainment as its showbiz superstar.
Minnie Mouse (voiced by Russi Taylor): Minnie operates as the club's show planner and bookkeeper, and is responsible for the club's day-to-day administration. Her performance at keeping the club running well makes her a pillar of support in times of crisis, especially in keeping Mickey calm when he panics over a situation.
Donald Duck (voiced by Tony Anselmo): Donald operates as the club's deputy manager, responsible for the overall customer service at the club and tending to the needs of VIP guests. Although a co-owner in the club, he is envious of Mickey's fame and position and tends to want to run the club himself, though his efforts are usually thwarted by his conscience preventing him betraying his friendship with Mickey.
Daisy Duck (voiced by Tress MacNeille): Daisy operates as the reservation clerk for the club, but often dreams of being a star in her own right, which often sees her attempting to try out a new act in the club that often backfires.
Goofy (voiced by Bill Farmer): Goofy operates as the head waiter, managing the club's restaurant operations with his usual accident-prone yet genial manner of work. Despite this difficulty, Goofy manages to ensure guests receive their meals without issues.
Pluto (voiced by Bill Farmer): Pluto operates as both the club's mascot, and as a personal assistant to both Mickey and Minnie.
Horace Horsecollar (voiced by Bill Farmer): Horace operates as the club's technical engineer, in charge of the lighting, loudspeakers, and video players. A recurring gag in the animated series is his habit of literally doing as told and hitting his equipment to get them working, and a tendency to state about what is wrong in general life, rather than specifically on something that just happened when asked.
Clarabelle Cow (voiced by April Winchell): Clarabelle operates as the club's gossip monger with her own show, collecting and spreading rumours about characters all over ToonTown, although her gossip tends to occasionally cause problems as a result.
Max Goof (voiced by Jason Marsden): Max operates as the club's valet parking attendant. He tends to enjoy his work, though a number of episodes feature stories about him debating over things he witnesses or wishes to enjoy.
Huey, Dewey, and Louie (all voiced by Tony Anselmo): Huey, Dewey and Louie operate as the club's house band. Throughout the course of the animated series' run, the trio operated under different names and genres of music, parodying noted music bands of the time - "The Quackstreet Boys", "Quackwerk", "Kid Duck" and "The Splashing Pumpkins".
Gus Goose (voiced by Frank Welker): Gus  operates as the club's chef, but his notorious gluttony tends to cause him to eat the food he prepares for guests before it is served.
Magic Mirror (voiced by Tony Jay): Magic Mirror acts as the club's on-site consultant, often providing advice when asked by Mickey and his friends, as well as answering queries about the club's guests.
Mic (pronounced "Mike;" voiced by Rod Roddy): Mic is a talking microphone, who operates as the club's announcer. The character is mainly involved at the beginning and end of the episodes, the latter often involving him providing a fictional advert connected to one of Disney's characters, cartoons, or animated films.
Penguin waiters: The penguin waiters from Mary Poppins operate as the waiting staff of the club, assisting Goofy.
Animated brooms: The brooms from Fantasias The Sorcerer's Apprentice operate as the janitors of the club, mainly keeping it clean.
Pete (voiced by Jim Cummings): Pete is the show's main antagonist and the club's shady landlord. Episodes featuring him tend to involve him seeking a way to shut down the club – per a contract he made with Mickey at the start of the animated series to own the House of Mouse, the club can only be shut down if there is no show going on. His efforts to do so always backfire.

Production
Then vice president of Disney Television Animation at the time, Barry Blumberg, wanted to produce a series that worked as a better format for Mickey Mouse Works. Roberts "Bobs" Gannaway and Tony Craig aimed to have the series reintroduce Disney characters to a new generation who were only familiar with them via marketing and "homogenized theme-park figures". They wanted to avoid making Mickey Mouse "hip" or "edgy" and retain the characters' personalities as closely as possible. The series was notable in that it allowed the characters to be played with more loosely as Craig stated, "Everybody thought it was really funny to loosen up a bit and let the characters be who they were and have some fun, instead of being so stiff". The crew was not allowed to use any of the characters from Tarzan due to licensing issues. Gannaway and Craig also deliberately tried to avoid using characters from The Hunchback of Notre Dame due to them being "inherently dramatic", nevertheless, Tantor, Quasimodo and a few other characters from The Hunchback of Notre Dame would make a couple of cameos in the series.

The show was produced by Walt Disney Television, and originally aired from 2001 to 2003, running for 52 episodes. The show is one of many Disney cartoon series made in the widescreen HD format. Like with Mickey Mouse Works, the animation was outsourced to Toon City in the Philippines. Unlike that series, it was also outsourced to Walt Disney Animation Australia and Walt Disney Animation Japan.

House of Mouse aired on One Saturday Morning on ABC. It reran from September 3, 2002 to February 4, 2006 on Disney Channel. The show ceased broadcast on U.S. television on February 6, 2009, after being aired for the last time on Toon Disney before becoming Disney XD.

The theme song is performed by Brian Setzer.

Awards and nominations

|-
|2001
|House of Mouse
|Annie Award for Outstanding Achievement in a Daytime Animated Television Production
|
|-
|2002
|Chris Roszak (background artist) at American Broadcasting Company (ABC)
|Daytime Emmy Award for Outstanding Individual in Animation
|
|-
|2002
|Jason Oliver (music editor) and Liz Lachman (scoring editor) for episodes "Pit Crew" and "Golf Nut Donald". 
|Motion Picture Sound Editors Golden Reel Award for Best Sound Editing in Television - Music, Episodic Animation
|
|-
|2003
|Corey Burton as the voice of "Ludwig Von Drake".
|Annie Award for Outstanding Voice Acting in an Animated Television Production
|
|}

References

External links
Official website

The Encyclopedia of Disney Animated Shorts
Character List by Whatsits Galore

2000s American animated television series
2000s American anthology television series
2001 American television series debuts
2003 American television series endings
American children's animated anthology television series
American children's animated comedy television series
American animated television spin-offs
Crossover animated television series
English-language television shows
ABC Kids (TV programming block)
Toon Disney original programming
Disney Media Networks franchises
Donald Duck television series
Mickey Mouse television series
Television series by Disney Television Animation
Television shows set in the United States
Fictional locations of Disney
Television series about ducks
Television series about cattle
Television shows about dogs
Animated television series about mice and rats
Television series about cats
American children's fantasy television series
Television series based on Disney films
Television series about horses